Francis William McCrea (September 6, 1896 – February 25, 1981) was a Major League Baseball catcher from Jersey City, New Jersey who played for one season. He played in one game for the Cleveland Indians on September 26 during the 1925 Cleveland Indians season, earning one hit in five at-bats. He died in Dover, New Jersey.

External links

1896 births
1981 deaths
Major League Baseball catchers
Cleveland Indians players
Hamilton Clippers players
Baseball players from Jersey City, New Jersey